Ali Khanaliuly Aliyev (born 27 October 1980) is a retired Kazakh footballer.

Career

Club
In March 2014, Aliyev joined FC Ordabasy as a Player-Coach.

Management
On 20 January 2021, Aliyev was appointed as Head Coach of Shakhter Karagandy.

From April 2022 to January 2023 head coach "Zhenis".

Career statistics
Last update: 15 December 2014

International

Statistics accurate as of match played on 23 May 2008

Honours
Kairat
Kazakhstan Premier League: 2004
Kazakhstan Cup: 2001, 2003

References

External links

Profile at KFF website

1980 births
Living people
Association football midfielders
Kazakhstani footballers
Kazakhstan international footballers
FC Kairat players
Kayseri Erciyesspor footballers
Akçaabat Sebatspor footballers
FC Tobol players
FC Vostok players
FC Irtysh Pavlodar players
Kazakhstan Premier League players
Kazakhstani expatriate footballers
Expatriate footballers in Turkey